The 2019 Broxbourne Borough Council election took place on 2 May 2019 to elect members of the Broxbourne Borough Council in England. This was on the same day as other local elections.

Results summary

Ward results

Broxbourne & Hoddesdon South

Cheshunt North

Cheshunt South & Theobalds

Flamstead End

Goffs Oak

Hoddesdon North

Hoddesdon Town & Rye Park

Rosedale & Bury Green

Waltham Cross

Wormley & Turnford

References

2019 English local elections
May 2019 events in the United Kingdom
2019
2010s in Hertfordshire